During the 2006–07 English football season, Brentford competed in Football League One. The club finished bottom of the league and was relegated to Football League Two.

Season summary

After defeat in the 2006 League One play-off semi-finals, Brentford were rocked by the resignation of popular manager Martin Allen on 30 May 2006, who stated he "had taken the club as far as I could and felt it was right for me to leave". Chairman Greg Dyke revealed that, despite an FA Cup run and the £500,000 sale of forward DJ Campbell during 2005–06 season, Allen's departure was due to the reduction of the cash-strapped club's wage budget for 2006–07. Chief scout John Griffin handled first team affairs until the appointment of Leroy Rosenior as manager on 14 June. Despite the off-season sales of star players Jay Tabb, Michael Turner and Sam Sodje generating upwards of £1,000,000, Rosenior was forced to bring in players on free transfers. A new spine for the team was assembled from central defenders Adam Griffiths and Matthew Heywood, midfielder Thomas Pinault and forwards Jo Kuffour and Chris Moore. Goalkeeper Stuart Nelson, full backs Andy Frampton and Kevin O'Connor, midfielders Ólafur Ingi Skúlason, Paul Brooker, Alex Rhodes and forwards Lloyd Owusu and Calum Willock remained from the previous season's squad, though Owusu would miss much of the campaign with a groin injury.

Brentford enjoyed a good start to the season, going undefeated in eight matches and rising as high as fourth in the table. A 2–0 league defeat to Swansea City on 12 September began a sharp downturn in fortunes, with injuries to eight senior players forcing Rosenior to turn to inexperienced youngsters John Mousinho, Clark Masters, Darius Charles, Ryan Peters, Karleigh Osborne and Karle Carder-Andrews. After injury to Calum Willock and a loss of form from Chris Moore, incoming forwards Clyde Wijnhard and Fola Onibuje failed to readdress the team's goalscoring problems. After a winless run of 16 games which dropped Brentford into the League One relegation zone, Leroy Rosenior was sacked as manager after a 4–0 home defeat to Crewe Alexandra on 18 November.

Youth team manager Scott B. Fitzgerald took over as caretaker manager and was later given the job on a permanent basis until the end of the season. Off the field there was a glimmer of hope in January 2007, when supporter Matthew Benham paid out nearly £3 million to take over some of the club's loans. Despite a clear-out of the squad, an influx of new signings and an additional goal threat from emerging youngster Charlie Ide, rookie manager Fitzgerald fared little better than his predecessor, winning just four of 24 matches before his departure after Brentford's relegation was confirmed on 9 April. Head of Youth Barry Quin took caretaker charge for the final four matches of the season and despite a first win in over two months, Brentford finished the campaign bottom of League One. 

The club finished with the worst away, overall attacking, overall defensive and home defensive records in League One, in addition to the lowest overall and lowest home goal differences. Club records set during the season included those of: 

 Fewest Football League wins in a season: 8 
 Fewest Football League home wins in a season: 5 (tied with 1946–47) 
 Most home Football League goals conceded in a season: 41 
 Lowest negative home goal difference in a Football League season: -17 
 Fewest points in a Football League season (3 points for a win): 37 
 Lowest winning percentage in a Football League season: 17.39% 
 Lowest winning percentage in a Football League season (all competitions): 15.686%

League table

Results
Brentford's goal tally listed first.

Legend

Pre-season and friendlies

Football League One

FA Cup

Football League Cup

Football League Trophy

 Sources: Soccerbase, 11v11

Playing squad 
Players' ages are as of the opening day of the 2006–07 season.

 Source: Soccerbase

Coaching staff

Leroy Rosenior (5 August – 18 November 2006)

Scott B. Fitzgerald (18 November 2006 – 10 April 2007)

Barry Quin (10 April – 5 May 2007)

Statistics

Appearances and goals
Substitute appearances in brackets.

 Players listed in italics left the club mid-season.
 Source: Soccerbase

Goalscorers 

 Players listed in italics left the club mid-season.
 Source: Soccerbase

Discipline

 Players listed in italics left the club mid-season.
 Source: ESPN FC

International caps 

 Players listed in italics left the club mid-season.

Management

Summary

Transfers & loans

Kit

|
|

Awards 
 Supporters' Player of the Year: Jo Kuffour
 Football League Best Sponsorship: Samvo

Notes

References

2006–07
Brentford